The AFI Directing Workshop for Women (DWW) is an innovative program in the American Film Institute (AFI) that has been offering free training workshops and the opportunity to direct short films that has helped to launch several successful careers. The program started in 1974 and more than 200 women have been given the opportunity to participate in this unique training program for future directors.

Origins
In the 1970s, though many women acted in major motion pictures, almost none directed them.  In 1974, Mathilde Krim, a scientist and Rockefeller Foundation board member, approached the American Film Institute (A.F.I.) about using her influence with the foundation to help women in film.  Jan Haag, Admission and Awards Administrator at A.F.I., set up a meeting with Krim to discuss possible options. Haag, anticipating at least $200,000, needed to revise her ideas when Krim informed her that she could easily secure only $30,000. A $200,000 grant would need to go through the formal, time-consuming review process that did not necessarily ensure a positive outcome.

To accommodate the limited budget, Haag and Antonio Vellani, A.F.I. administrator and future director of its Center for Advanced Film Studies (CAFS), submitted a plan to Krim to create the Directing Workshop for Women (DWW), based on the Directing Workshop at the CAFS.  To save money, DWW students would use the CAFS equipment and the CAFS students would act as producers, cinematographers, etc. for DWW projects.  Though the women could use CAFS equipment, the DWW needed additional editing equipment, which would cost $14,000.  After these expenses were met, each student would receive a budget of $300 per film to cover expenses and would make two films.  The A.F.I. also formalized an agreement with the Screen Actors Guild, which allowed their actors to volunteer to act in DWW films.

Once the AFI officially obtained the Rockefeller Foundation's grant for the program, Haag's next step was to establish a review board to choose twelve students for admission. The applicant review board Haag and Vellani decided on consisted of four successful women: Joan Didion, a famous writer; Marcia Nasiter, Vice President of United Artists; Kitty Hawks, an agent; and Barbara Schultz, an executive at PBS.

History
The organization received much interest, and many of its applicants were famous actresses, writers, producers, etc.  The initial twelve students the review board chose did not include any of the famous actresses who applied; in fact, the review board excluded the prominent thespians intentionally, opting, instead, to choose unknown women.  But Haag and Vellani believed admitting a few famous names would not only bring recognition to the program, i.e. media attention, but also help women  exercise enough influence to step into directing very soon. With only unknown names, they feared that the DWW would become an admirable program that would never wield enough power to help women direct major motion pictures.  Haag managed to expand the number of students to nineteen, thus including some well known actresses as well as at least one minority woman.

The nineteen women admitted were: Maya Angelou (writer), Karen Arthur (actress), Ellen Burstyn (actress), Juleen Compton (writer, director, actress), Lee Grant (actress), Nessa Hyams (casting director), Margot Kidder (actress), Joanna Lee (writer), Lynne Littman (producer), Kathleen Nolan (actress), Julia Phillips (producer), Susan Martin (actress/producer), Marjorie Mullen (script supervisor), Giovanna Nigro (producer, writer, director), Susan Oliver (actress), Gail Parent (writer), Marion Rothman (editor), Lily Tomlin (actress, comedian), and Nancy Walker (actress).

Despite the limited funds, the DWW enjoyed enough notoriety to ensure a larger amount of financial support in its subsequent cycles.  For example, Nessa Hyams went on to direct episodes of Mary Hartman, Mary Hartman.  For its second cycle, the Rockefeller Foundation approved a $100,000 grant.  In its fourth cycle, the A.F.I. decided to stop admitting famous actresses, and just as Haag feared, shortly afterwards, the media lost much of its interest.

The DWW still exists today with two goals: to offer women career opportunities to direct films and offer them educational opportunities to learn to develop their filmmaking skills. Several early films received Academy Award nominations and many alumni have won awards at film festivals, including Cannes.

Sources
 The AFI Directing Workshop for Women website
Haag, Jan. “The Dream of the Marble Bridge: The Founding of the Directing Workshop 
For Women of the American Film Institute, A History.” By Jan Haag. 2002. 
http://janhaag.com/ESessays.html (29 January 2007). 
New York Times, 1974-1977
Los Angeles Times, 1974-1977

Further reading
 

Film organizations in the United States
Film schools in the United States
American Film Institute
1974 establishments in the United States